Tetraselenium tetranitride is the inorganic compound with the formula . Like the analogous tetrasulfur tetranitride ,  is an orange solid.

The Se–Se and Se–N distances are 2.740 and 1.800 Å, respectively. The N–Se–N angles are 90°.

References

Explosive chemicals
Inorganic compounds
Nitrides
Eight-membered rings
Nitrogen heterocycles
Heterocyclic compounds with 3 rings
Selenium compounds